Senator Quick may refer to:

Dan Quick (born 1957), Nebraska State Senate
Edward Quick (1935–2016), Missouri State Senate
William F. Quick (1885–1966), Wisconsin State Senate